Teguldetsky District  is an administrative and municipal district (raion), one of the sixteen in Tomsk Oblast, Russia. It is located in the east of the oblast and borders Verkhneketsky District in the north, Krasnoyarsk Krai in the east, Kemerovo Oblast in the south, and Zyryansky and Pervomaysky Districts in the west. Its administrative center is the rural locality (a selo) of Teguldet. As of the 2010 Census, the total population of the district was 6,937, with the population of Teguldet accounting for 63.2% of that number.

History
The district was established in 1936.

References

Notes

Sources

Districts of Tomsk Oblast
States and territories established in 1936
